The Stadiasmus Maris Magni is an ancient Roman periplus or guidebook detailing the ports sailors encounter on the shores of the Mediterranean Sea.  The stadiasmus provides distances, sailing directions and descriptions of specific ports. It was written in Ancient Greek and survives in fragments. The work was written by an anonymous author and is dated to the second half of the third century AD.  The most complete Greek text together with a Latin translation was published in 1855 by Karl Müller as part of his work Geographi Graeci Minores.

References

Sources

Further reading

External links 
 Stadiasmus Maris Magni, translated into English, at Topostext

History of navigation
Roman itineraries
Peripluses in Greek